3325 TARDIS is a dark Alauda asteroid from the outer region of the asteroid belt, approximately  in diameter. It was discovered on 3 May 1984, by American astronomer Brian Skiff at Lowell's Anderson Mesa Station, Arizona, in the United States. The asteroid was named TARDIS, after the fictional time machine and spacecraft from the science fiction television series Doctor Who.

Orbit and classification 

TARDIS is a member of the Alauda family, a large family of typically bright carbonaceous asteroids and named after its parent body, 702 Alauda.

It orbits the Sun in the outer main-belt at a distance of 3.1–3.2 AU once every 5 years and 8 months (2,076 days). Its orbit has an eccentricity of 0.01 and an inclination of 22° with respect to the ecliptic.

Naming 

It is named after the acronym TARDIS (Time And Relative Dimension In Space), the space and time travel vehicle used by the Doctor in the British science fiction television series Doctor Who. The fictional time machine looks like a police telephone box from mid-twentieth century Britain. The official naming citation was published by the Minor Planet Center on 11 March 1990.

Physical characteristics 

According to the survey carried out by the Infrared Astronomical Satellite IRAS and NASA's NEOWISE mission, TARDIS measures 28.2 and 29.7 kilometers in diameter, and its surface has a low albedo of 0.055 and 0.067, respectively. An albedo between 0.05 and 0.06 is typical for carbonaceous asteroids of the outer main-belt. As of 2016, no rotational lightcurves have been obtained and the asteroid's period and shape still remains unknown.

References

External links 
 Lightcurve Database Query (LCDB), at www.minorplanet.info
 Dictionary of Minor Planet Names, Google books
 Asteroids and comets rotation curves, CdR – Geneva Observatory, Raoul Behrend
 Discovery Circumstances: Numbered Minor Planets (1)-(5000) – Minor Planet Center
 
 

003325
Discoveries by Brian A. Skiff
Named minor planets
19840503